The men's 400 metres hurdles at the 2004 Summer Olympics as part of the athletics program were held at the Athens Olympic Stadium from August 23 to 26. There were 35 competitors from 24 nations. The event was won by Félix Sánchez of the Dominican Republic, the nation's first medal in the men's 400 metres hurdles. Silver went to Danny McFarlane of Jamaica, returning to the podium in the event for the first time since 1992. Naman Keïta's bronze was France's first medal in the event in over 100 years; the last Frenchman to medal in the long hurdles was Henri Tauzin in 1900. The United States' five-Games gold medal (and podium) streak ended; for only the second time in the history of the event, Americans competed but won no medals (after 1968, with the United States also not on the podium in 1980 due to the boycott).

Background

This was the 23rd time the event was held. It had been introduced along with the men's 200 metres hurdles in 1900, with the 200 being dropped after 1904 and the 400 being held through 1908 before being left off the 1912 programme. However, when the Olympics returned in 1920 after World War I, the men's 400 metres hurdles was back and would continue to be contested at every Games thereafter.

The top four of the eight finalists from the 2000 Games returned: gold medalist Angelo Taylor of the United States, silver medalist Hadi Souan Somayli of Saudi Arabia, bronze medalist Llewellyn Herbert of South Africa, and fourth-place finisher James Carter of the United States. Félix Sánchez of the Dominican Republic had finished 20th in 2000, but had risen to prominence since as he won the 2001 and 2003 World Championships. He was the favorite in Athens. Defending champion Taylor made it to the semifinals but did not qualify for the final.

Belize, Kazakhstan, Mali, and Niger each made their debut in the event. The United States made its 22nd appearance, most of any nation, having missed only the boycotted 1980 Games.

Summary

In the final, a false start had been accredited to at least three athletes including Dominican Republic's Félix Sánchez, a solid pre-race favorite in this event. Nonetheless, he sped out of the blocks, and quickly opened his lead over the American and fastest pre-Olympic entrant James Carter on the sixth hurdle. The two had chased against each other towards the final bend with Carter pulling ahead into the lead. As Carter went backwards in the last two hurdles, Sanchez left the field trailing to quickly move again to the front and maintained it to a blazing finish in his seasonal best at 47.63 seconds, extending his winning streak on his forty-third race since the previous defeat in 2001. Behind him, Jamaican hurdler Danny McFarlane and delighted Frenchman Naman Keïta edged Carter out to a ragged fourth to deny the American supremacy on the podium for the first time at a non-boycotted Games since 1968, giving both of them the silver and bronze respectively.

Qualification

The qualification period for athletics was 1 January 2003 to 9 August 2004. For the men's 400 metres hurdles, each National Olympic Committee was permitted to enter up to three athletes that had run the race in 49.20 seconds or faster during the qualification period. The maximum number of athletes per nation had been set at 3 since the 1930 Olympic Congress. If an NOC had no athletes that qualified under that standard, one athlete that had run the race in 49.50 seconds or faster could be entered.

Competition format

The competition used the three-round format used every Games since 1908 (except the four-round competition in 1952): quarterfinals, semifinals, and a final. The hurdles were 3 feet (91.5 centimetres) tall and were placed 35 metres apart beginning 45 metres from the starting line, resulting in a 40 metres home stretch after the last hurdle. The 400 metres track was standard.

There were 5 quarterfinal heats with 7 athletes each. The top 4 men in each quarterfinal advanced to the semifinals along with the next fastest 4 overall. The 24 semifinalists were divided into 3 semifinals of 8 athletes each, with the top 2 in each semifinal and the next 2 fastest overall advancing to the 8-man final.

Records

, the existing world and Olympic records were as follows.

No new world or Olympic records were set during the competition.

Schedule

All times are Greece Standard Time (UTC+2)

Results

Quarterfinals

Qualification rule: The first four finishers in each heat (Q) plus the next four fastest overall runners (q) advanced to the semifinals.

Quarterfinal 1

Quarterfinal 2

Quarterfinal 3

Quarterfinal 4

Quarterfinal 5

Semifinals

Qualification rule: The first two finishers in each heat (Q) plus the next two fastest overall runners (q) moved on to the final.

Semifinal 1

Semifinal 2

Semifinal 3

Final

Results summary

References

External links
 IAAF Athens 2004 Olympic Coverage

M
400 metres hurdles at the Olympics
Men's events at the 2004 Summer Olympics